The 1988 Vuelta a España was the 43rd Edition Vuelta a España, taking place from 25 April to 15 May 1988. Sean Kelly started the race as the principal favourite after performance in the 1987 Vuelta a España in which he was leading the General classification with several days remaining in the race when he was forced to withdraw due to injury. Luis "Lucho" Herrera returned to defend his title while 1985 Vuelta winner Pedro Delgado had decided to ride the 1988 Giro d'Italia in preparation for the 1988 Tour de France. The BH team directed by Javier Mínguez, presented solid opposition with the strong climbers Álvaro Pino (winner of the 1986 Vuelta a España) and Anselmo Fuerte. In the end, Kelly won the race and became the first Irish winner of the Vuelta a España.

Route
The first stage introduced an innovative format of five heats, each with two riders per team, with the team leaders appearing in the final heat.

Results

Final General classification

KOM Classification

Points Classification

Team classification

Best First Year Professional

References

External links
Race website

 
1988
1988 in road cycling
1988 in Spanish sport